The 2017–18 Euroleague Basketball Next Generation Tournament, also called Adidas Next Generation Tournament by sponsorship reasons, is the 16th edition of the international junior basketball tournament organized by the Euroleague Basketball Company.

As in past years, 32 teams joined the first stage, which are played in four qualifying tournaments between January and February 2017.

Qualifying tournaments

Torneig de Bàsquet Junior Ciutat de L'Hospitalet
The Torneig de Bàsquet Junior Ciutat de L'Hospitalet was played between 5 and 7 January 2018.

Group A

Group B

Classification games

Final

Kaunas Tournament
The Kaunas Tournament was played between 19 and 21 January 2018.

Group A

Group B

Classification games

Final

Munich Tournament
The Munich Tournament was played between 9 and 11 February 2018.

Group A

Group B

Classification games

Final

Belgrade Tournament
The Belgrade Tournament was played between 23 and 25 February 2018.

Group A

Group B

Classification games

Final

Final Tournament
The Final Tournament was played between 17 and 20 May 2018 in Belgrade, Serbia.

Teams

Group A

Group B

Final

Awards
MVP
 Deividas Sirvydis (Lietuvos Rytas)

Rising star
 Usman Garuba (Real Madrid)

All-tournament team
 Dalph Adem Panopio (Stella Azzurra)
 Deividas Sirvydis (Lietuvos Rytas)
 Mario Nakić (Real Madrid)
 Joel Parra (Divina Seguros Joventut)
 Marek Blaževič (Lietuvos Rytas)

References

External links
Official website

Euroleague Basketball Next Generation Tournament
Next Generation Tournament